Robert (before 885-after November 902) was Count of Blois at the end of the 9th and the beginning of the 10th century. The only other thing know about him is that he countersigned a charter in November 902, in which Warnegaud, Vicomte de Blois and his wife Helena donated property.

Sources 
 Charles Crawley: Medieval Lands - Central France: Blois, Tours

Counts of Blois
Year of death missing
9th-century French people